William Henry Harrison Benyaurd (May 17, 1841 – February 7, 1900) was a Union Army officer during the American Civil War who earned the Medal of Honor for his actions at Five Forks, Virginia on April 1, 1865.

Military career
Benyaurd graduated sixth in his class at West Point in 1863. Upon graduation he was immediately promoted to the rank of first lieutenant in the Corps of Engineers.

In August 1864 he was breveted to the rank of captain for "gallantry and meritorious service" in the campaign before Richmond, Virginia. In April 1865, he received a brevet to major for heroism in the Battle of Five Forks. He was awarded the Medal of Honor on September 7, 1897 for the same action.

From 1866 to 1869, Benyaurd served as an assistant professor at West Point. In 1874, President Ulysses S. Grant appointed him to a special five-man commission to develop a reclamation plan for the Mississippi River Valley. Benyaurd served as a commissioner intensively studying the waterway until 1879, when Congress created the current Mississippi River Commission. He was then assigned to waterway maintenance on the tributaries to the lower Mississippi River, which included an ongoing effort to clear snags caused by vessels which sank there during or after the Civil War.

He was promoted to the rank of lieutenant colonel in 1889. During the Spanish–American War he was in charge of submarine defenses (i.e., mines) at Jacksonville and Tampa Bay, Florida. He was also in command of defensive fortification on the St. John River in Florida.

He died on active duty in 1900 and is buried at the West Point Cemetery.

He was a member of the Military Order of the Loyal Legion of the United States and the Military Order of Foreign Wars.

Legacy
The United States Army Corps Of Engineers operates a large towboat named in his honor. The Motor Vessel (M/V) Benyaurd works out of the Corps of Engineers' Mississippi Valley Division in Vicksburg, Mississippi, as is assigned to the Corps' Vicksburg District.

Promotions
 1st Lieutenant – June 11, 1863
 Brevet Captain – August 1, 1864
 Brevet Major – April 1, 1865
 Captain – May 1, 1866
 Major – March 4, 1879
 Lieutenant Colonel – July 2, 1889

Medal of Honor citation
"With one companion, voluntarily advanced in a reconnaissance beyond the skirmishers, where he was exposed to imminent peril; also, in the same battle, rode to the front with the commanding general to encourage wavering troops to resume the advance, which they did successfully."

References

1841 births
1900 deaths
United States Military Academy alumni
Military personnel from Philadelphia
Union Army officers
United States Army Medal of Honor recipients
American Civil War recipients of the Medal of Honor
United States Military Academy faculty
United States Army Corps of Engineers personnel
American military personnel of the Spanish–American War
Burials at West Point Cemetery